Scopula caberaria is a moth of the family Geometridae. It was described by Claude Herbulot in 1992. It is endemic to Cameroon.

References

Endemic fauna of Cameroon
Moths described in 1992
caberaria
Taxa named by Claude Herbulot
Moths of Africa